The 2000 Summer Olympics torch relay was the transferral of    the Olympic Flame to Sydney, Australia, that built up to the 2000 Summer Olympics. The torch travelled to various island nations as part of a tour of Oceania before beginning an extensive journey around Australia. For the first time the Flame was taken underwater, with a special flare-like torch taken on a dive down to the Great Barrier Reef. At the opening ceremony the cauldron was lit by Aboriginal athlete Cathy Freeman.

Relay elements
A History of the Olympic Torch Relay has been written by Janet Cahill covering all relays to Sydney 2000. She is also author of the Olympic Torch Relay section of the "Official Report of the XXVII Olympiad, Sydney 2000 Olympic Games. Volume Two - Celebrating The Games".

Torch
The design of the torch reflected three famed areas of Australian culture: the boomerang, the Sydney Opera House, and the waters of the Pacific Ocean. The concept also reflected the elements of earth, fire, and water. This was achieved across three layers of the torch. The first, inner layer contains the fuel system and combustor, the second contains the fuel canister, and the outer layer is a specially textured aluminium shell. A combination of copper, brass, aluminium, and stainless steel was used in its construction, and the fuel comprised 65 percent butane and 35 percent propane. In total, 14,000 torches were produced. The distance covered by each torchbearer was 105.478 km.

Torchbearers

A total of 13,400 torch-bearers were involved in the relay. The Greek leg of the route saw 800 people carry the torch, while 1,500 people were involved across Oceania. As part of the vast traversal of Australia, 11,000 people carried the torch within the country.

The first Australian torch-bearer was Sophie Gosper, the daughter of International Olympic Committee (IOC) Vice-President Kevan Gosper. Her selection caused considerable controversy with accusations of corruption directed at the Hellenic Olympic Committee (HOC). Greek-Australian Yianna Souleles was originally due to receive the torch in Olympia but was replaced at late notice by Gosper. Kevan Gosper accepted the invitation for his daughter to carry the torch while claiming to be unaware that this would make her the first Australian to have the honour.

The HOC's invitation was seen as an attempt to curry favour with the IOC after being warned that its delays put the planned 2004 Olympics (scheduled to be held in Greece) in jeopardy. Gosper's acceptance of the invitation was portrayed by the media as being nepotistic and inappropriate, with Australian politicians, Olympic athletes, and officials from various Olympic Committees condemning the move. Gosper initially defended his actions but would go on to make a public apology, claiming that fatherly pride had clouded his judgement. He gave up his role in the relay at the Melbourne Cricket Ground despite having previously described it as "the most important moment of my life since I won a silver medal [there]".

Route
The Flame was lit during a ceremony in Olympia, as has been tradition at all the Summer Games since those in 1936. The Flame is initiated by using a parabolic mirror that concentrates the sun's rays. However, due to some cloud cover on the day of the ceremony, there was insufficient sunlight to create the required level of heat. A backup, lit on the previous day during rehearsals, was used instead. The remainder of the ceremony could then take place.

The relay always begins in Greece and travels from Olympia to Athens and the Panathenaic Stadium. The Hellenic Olympic Committee arranged for the torch to be taken to several Greek islands, a first in the history of Olympic relays. The torch arrived in Athens on 20 May, after which it began a tour of Oceania. The Flame was flown firstly to Guam, before moving to Palau, Micronesia, Nauru, the Solomon Islands, Papua New Guinea, Vanuatu, Samoa, American Samoa, the Cook Islands, Tonga, and New Zealand. The relay had been scheduled to visit Fiji, but the country was omitted due to ongoing government instability at that time.

After the island tour the Flame arrived in Australia on 8 June. The relay was an extensive journey around the country, involving 11,000 torch-bearers and a variety of modes of transport. On 27 June the Flame was taken underwater, a first in the history of torch relays. Marine biologist Wendy Craig Duncan carried a special version of the torch for a three-minute trip around Agincourt Reef, a section of the Great Barrier Reef popular with divers. The torch was modified to carry a specially designed flare that would burn at 2,000 degrees Celsius underwater while remaining as aesthetically similar to the normal flame as possible.

Route in Greece
May 10 (day 1)
Olympia, Pyrgos, Amaliada, Tripoli
May 20 (day 2)
Athens
May 20 (day 3)
Panathenaic Stadium

Route in Oceania (South Pacific Islands)

Route in New Zealand

Route in Australia

Lighting of the cauldron

The Australian middle distance gold-medallist Herb Elliott carried the torch into Stadium Australia and passed it on to the final runners. The final succession of torch-bearers were selected to celebrate the 100 year anniversary of female participation in the Olympic Games (women were not allowed to compete at the inaugural 1896 Summer Olympics but were given the opportunity in 1900). Betty Cuthbert, Raelene Boyle, Dawn Fraser, Shirley Strickland, Shane Gould, and Debbie Flintoff-King, all medallists in previous Games, were given the honour of carrying the Flame before passing it to the final torch-bearer.

The cauldron was lit by Aboriginal athlete Cathy Freeman, a decision that was at the time reported as being a "bold political and social statement". Freeman was the first competing athlete to light the Olympic cauldron. Two elements from the torch concept, fire and water, were replicated in the design of the cauldron. Freeman stood atop a pool of water and lit a flame that surrounded her. Though a computer glitch delayed proceedings for a few minutes the Flame then lifted around Freeman.

The ten-year anniversary of the Games was celebrated in a special ceremony in 2010. Cathy Freeman and Paralympic champion Louise Sauvage (who was the final torchbearer at the Paralympic Games) lit the cauldron during an event attended by numerous athletes and school students. The twenty-year anniversary of the Games was celebrated in a special ceremony in 2020. The cauldron was re-lit by two up-and-coming athletes; Indigenous basketballer Tenayah Logan and teenage Paralympian Tamsin Colley. It was attended by Ian Thorpe, Louise Sauvage and local Sydneysiders who were volunteers during the games. Freeman sent a video message.

References
Notes

Bibliography
 Cahill, J. (1999) Running Towards Sydney 2000; A History of the Olympic Torch Relay, Walla Walla Press, Sydney

External links
Entry for the Olympic Cauldron at Sydney Olympic Park at the Australian Office of Environment & Heritage

Torch Relay, 2000 Summer Olympics
Olympic torch relays